Burlington station is a train station in Burlington, North Carolina. It is served by Amtrak, the United States' passenger rail system, and hosts two Amtrak trains, the Carolinian and Piedmont. The street address is 101 North Main Street, and is located in the heart of downtown Burlington.

History 

The present Railroad Depot was once the site of a large locomotive repair shop facility during the mid-19th century for the North Carolina Railroad. On this site was a camp of recruitment and instruction for the 6th North Carolina Troops during the American Civil War. In July 1861, these troops left Company Shops to ride by rail to the Battle of Manassas, Virginia. this was the first time in American history that military personnel were transported by rail in to combat.

In 1895 the property was acquired by the Southern Railroad, along with the rest of NCRR. It was restored as a railroad station in 2003. There is a small museum in the lobby of the train station that depicts the railroad history of Company Shops and its progression into the city of Burlington. Prior to this period, trains stopped at a prefabricated office trailer, and before this a former Southern Railway station that was moved to another part of Burlington in order to make way for a road improvement project.

References

External links 

Burlington Station – NC By Train
Burlington Amtrak Station & Former Southern Railway Station (USA Rail Guide – Train Web)

Buildings and structures in Alamance County, North Carolina
Amtrak stations in North Carolina
Stations along Southern Railway lines in the United States
Transportation in Alamance County, North Carolina